In Greek mythology, Niobe was a daughter of Phoroneus and the mother by Zeus of Argus, who was the eponym of Argos and sometimes, Pelasgus. She is not to be confused with the more famous Niobe, who was punished for boasting that she had more children than Leto.

Notes

References
 Apollodorus, The Library with an English Translation by Sir James George Frazer, F.B.A., F.R.S. in 2 Volumes, Cambridge, MA, Harvard University Press; London, William Heinemann Ltd. 1921. ISBN 0-674-99135-4. Online version at the Perseus Digital Library. Greek text available from the same website.
Plato, Timaeus in Plato in Twelve Volumes, Vol. 9 translated by W.R.M. Lamb. Cambridge, Massachusetts, Harvard University Press; London, William Heinemann Ltd. 1925. Online version at the Perseus Digital Library. Greek text available at the same website.
Pseudo-Clement, Recognitions from Ante-Nicene Library Volume 8, translated by Smith, Rev. Thomas. T. & T. Clark, Edinburgh. 1867. Online version at theio.com
.
 .

Princesses in Greek mythology
Inachids
Mortal women of Zeus

Mythology of Argolis